Tina Lutz (born 25 October 1990) is a German sailor who has competed in the Optimist and 49er FX categories. Along with Susann Beucke, she won a gold medal at the 2017 and 2020 49er & 49er FX European Championships., having won a gold medal at the 2005 Optimist World Championships. Beucke and Lutz qualified to represent Germany at the 2020 Summer Olympics in Tokyo,
 competing in 49er FX.

References

External links
 
 
 
 
 

1990 births
Living people
Sportspeople from Munich
German female sailors (sport)
Olympic sailors of Germany
Optimist class sailors 
49er FX class sailors
Sailors at the 2020 Summer Olympics – 49er FX
Olympic silver medalists for Germany
Olympic medalists in sailing
Medalists at the 2020 Summer Olympics